"Put Your Dreams Away" is a song written by Richard Leigh and Wayland Holyfield, and performed by American country music artist Mickey Gilley.  It was released in June 1982 as the first single and title track from the album Put Your Dreams Away.  The song was Gilley's fourteenth number one on the country chart.  The single stayed at number one for one week and spent a total of twelve weeks on the country chart.

Chart performance

References
 

1982 singles
1982 songs
Mickey Gilley songs
Songs written by Richard Leigh (songwriter)
Songs written by Wayland Holyfield
Song recordings produced by Jim Ed Norman
Epic Records singles